Jalan Batang Kali–Hulu Yam Bharu (Selangor state route B113) is a major road in Selangor, Malaysia.

List of junctions

Roads in Selangor